C. glabrum  may refer to:
 Caryocar glabrum, a flowering plant species
 Ceriagrion glabrum, a damselfly species found in Africa
 Clerodendrum glabrum, a small to medium deciduous tree species widespread from Tropical to Southern Africa

See also